Ashley Naylor (born 23 August 1960) is a former English professional squash player.

Naylor lived in Batley, Yorkshire. He first took up squash in 1973 and became Yorkshire champion in 1983 and 1984. He became a full English international in 1980.

References

External links
 

English male squash players
1960 births
Living people
Sportspeople from Batley
20th-century English people